Kyme (born November 21, 1962) is an American film and television actress. She is mostly remembered for her portrayal of "Rachel Meadows" in the 1988 film School Daze. Her television credits include guest appearances on Chicago Hope, The Parkers, Frasier, NYPD Blue and 24.

Filmography

References

External links

1962 births
American film actresses
American television actresses
Living people
20th-century American actresses
21st-century American actresses